The Laghman airstrikes refers to two separate airstrikes by the United States, with claimed Pakistani support or compliance, (20 April 2007 and 23 January 2009).

See also 
 Shrawangai Nazarkhel airstrike

References 

Airstrikes of the insurgency in Khyber Pakhtunkhwa
2007 in Pakistan
2009 in Pakistan